Eladio Vicuña Aránguiz (June 2, 1911 – June 29, 2008) was a Chilean prelate of the Roman Catholic Church. He was born in Santiago de Chile. He had his priestly ordination on September 22, 1934.

During his religious career, Aránguiz worked as the Bishop of Chillán (1955–1974) and as the Archbishop of Puerto Montt (1974–1987). In the latter position, he was succeeded by Savino Bernardo Maria Cazzaro Bertollo.

External links
Catholic Hierarchy 
Eladio Vicuña Aránguiz's obituary 

1911 births
2008 deaths
20th-century Roman Catholic archbishops in Chile
20th-century Roman Catholic bishops in Chile
People from Santiago
Deaths from pneumonia in Chile
Participants in the Second Vatican Council
Roman Catholic bishops of Chillán
Roman Catholic archbishops of Puerto Montt